Huai Krasiao or Khlong Krasiao is a watercourse in the province of Uthai Thani and Suphan Buri, Thailand. It is a tributary of the Tha Chin River.

Krasiao